Glottal can mean:
related to the glottis
related to the vocal folds
glottal consonant
related to glottalization